Luke Toia (born 23 November 1977) is a former Australian rules footballer who played for the Fremantle Dockers between 1996 and 2003. He was drafted from Subiaco in the WAFL as a predraft selection in the 1994 AFL Draft and played mainly as a rover. He last played for Claremont in the WAFL.

External links

1977 births
Fremantle Football Club players
Subiaco Football Club players
Living people
Australian rules footballers from Western Australia
People from Boulder, Western Australia
Mines Rovers Football Club players
Western Australian State of Origin players